Colonel Paul Richard Freyberg, 2nd Baron Freyberg,  (27 May 1923 – 26 May 1993) was a British soldier and peer.

Born in Paddington, London, was the son of Lieutenant General Bernard Freyberg and his wife Barbara McLaren. Barbara was the widow of Hon. Francis Walter Stafford McLaren and had had two sons, Martin John McLaren and Guy Lewis Ian McLaren, who were thus half-brothers to Paul Freyberg. Paul was educated at Eton College, Berkshire. He became a lieutenant colonel in the Grenadier Guards.

During the Second World War, he served with the 2nd New Zealand Division in Greece in 1941 and the Long Range Desert Group in the Middle East 1941–42, then with the Grenadier Guards in Tunisia and Italy 1942–45. Postwar he was in the British Army of the Rhine 1950–51 and other postings and the Ministry of Defence. He was commander of the Honourable Artillery Company, Infantry Battalion between 1965 and 1968. He was awarded the Military Cross in 1943 and appointed an Officer of the Order of the British Empire in the 1965 Birthday Honours.

Freyberg married Ivry Perronelle Katharine Guild in 1960. He succeeded to his father's title in 1963.

Paul Freyberg was the author of the authorised biography of his father, Bernard Freyberg V.C.: Soldier of Two Nations, which was published in 1991.

References

Burke's Peerage and Baronetage (106th edition, 1999)

1923 births
1993 deaths
Barons in the Peerage of the United Kingdom
People educated at Eton College
British Army personnel of World War II
Grenadier Guards officers
Honourable Artillery Company officers
Officers of the Order of the British Empire
Recipients of the Military Cross
Military personnel from London
Burials in Surrey
People from Paddington